John O'Hara and His Playboys was a Glasgow 1960s–70s pop group. The band had a  successful career in Germany between 1962 and 1966. They toured widely in Germany, headlining at the Star Club in Hamburg several times, and sang with Barbara Murphy. O'Hara went on to play with British band The Californians. After the band's return to UK they supported various major American bands in concert and 1968-69 made eight TV appearances on ITV, Scottish Television, Teilifís Éireann, BBC1 and BBC2 including the Golden Shot. They were the first band to be given both halves of an episode of Colour Me Pop being filmed live in Sheffield for the first half of the programme and then recording the second half at the BBC.

Discography

Singles
1964 - "Louie Louie" / "Stampfkartoffeln Tä-Tä-Rä" - John O'Hara and His Playboys, Decca Germany 1964 Decca D19552
1964 - "Das War Gestern" / "Ein Zwei Drei"  - Decca Germany
1964 - "Doo Wah Diddy Diddy" / "Mr Moonlight" - Decca D19554
1966 - "Start all over" / "I've Been Wondering" - Fontana TF763
1967 - "Spicks and Specks" / "One Fine Lady" - Fontana TF793
1967 - "Ballad of the Soon Departed" / "Tell Me Why" - Fontana TF 872
1967 - "Island in the Sun" / "Harry" - Fontana TF893
1968 - "In the Shelter of Your Heart" / Goodnight Mr Moonlight - Fontana TF924
1968 - "I Started A Joke" / "Show Me" - Fontana TF974
1968 - "Voices" / "Blue Dog" - Fontana  
1969 - "More Than Just A Woman" / "No No No No" - Fontana TF1043

Albums
1964 LP - Playboys Party No1 - Decca BLK16295P Last night/ Medley: Mashed potatoes; Es gibt kein bier auf Hawai; Mashed potatoes/Das Humbta-Tatera / Skinny Minnie/ Watermelon man/ La Bamba/ Twist and shout/ What'd I say/ Jumping with symphony Sid.
1968 LP - Get Ready - Fontana TLF461

References

Scottish pop music groups